Jean Valvis (born July 16, 1954, in Athens, Greece) is a businessman of Swiss and Greek citizenship. His name is related to two important multinational transactions: the sale of Dorna Apemin S.A. to Coca-Cola Hellenic Bottling Company and The Coca-Cola Company in 2002, and the sale of Dorna Lactate to Lactalis Group in 2008. 
 
At present, Jean Valvis focuses on developing the wine division- Domeniile Samburesti and starting other projects which started showing results in 2010: extending investments in eco agriculture and eco energy projects with Dorna Agri, on 10,000 ha land nearby Calarasi (Roseti), South of Romania and launching the brand AQUA Carpatica, marketed as the only naturally sparkling mineral water with zero nitrates.

Biography
Jean Valvis was born in Athens on July 16, 1954, but his family lives in Geneva, where he started his studies. He has three sons: Christos Nikolaos, born in 1998, Stefanos, born in 1999 and Aristotelis Dimitrios, born in 2016.

After finishing primary and middle school in Geneva, he attended “Varvakios” Model High School.

In 1973, he started his academic studies at the National Technical University of Athens, graduating in 1979 with an architect engineer degree.

In 1980, he attended the courses of the University Paris I, Pantheon Sorbonne, getting an advanced graduate diploma in architectural aesthetics (DEA), entitled Argument on Space and Architectural Composition.

In 1982, he obtained a research grant from the Aristotelis Onassis Foundation and drew up a thesis at the same University of Sorbonne, entitled Model Theory in Architectural Design Process.

Entrepreneurial activity
In 1994, he established Valvis Holding setting up Dorna Apemin, a joint-stock company with Romanian-Swiss capital. Within this company, three mineral water plants were built under the Dorna brand in Vatra Dornei, Suceava (Dorna, Poiana Negri, Izvorul Alb), between 1996-1999.
In 1998, he established Dorna Lactate SA and built, under the green field scheme, a dairy processing plant in Dorna Candreni and, in 1999, a process cheese factory in Vatra Dornei, processing a range of 85 dairy products under LaDORNA brand.
In 2000, he established a subsidiary of the holding in Athens: Dorna Hellas.
In 2001, he established Carpathian Plastics Corporations.
In 2002, he concluded the transaction with Coca-Cola and sells Dorna. This year he also laid the foundations of the Ecological Biofarms project, as part of the eco agricultural activity performed by the Dorna Agri company, project launched in 2004, for Bio cereals.
In 2003 and 2004, a cottage cheese factory (Ortoaia, Suceva) and a sheep milk feta cheese (Mihail Kogalniceanu, Constanta) are built under the green field scheme.
In 2004, he also concluded the property transfer to ICPPAM Balotesti, a platform meant to be part of the eco agricultural project.
In 2006, he invested in SC Viti-Pomicola Samburesti and in 2009 he launched a range of wines under the following brands: Château Valvis, Domeniile Samburesti and Samburel de Olt.
In 2008 LaDorna is sold to Lactalis, the second largest dairy company in the world and Valvis focuses on developing the wine division- Domeniile Samburesti and starting other projects which started showing results in 2010: extending investments in eco agriculture and eco energy projects with Dorna Agri, on 10,000 ha land nearby Calarasi (Roseti), South of Romania and launching the brand AQUA Carpatica, the only water in the world with 0g nitrates/liter.
Even from its launch, AQUA Carpatica became a success and a serious competitor for the mineral water market in Romania, their slogan - "“The purest mineral water in the world”, a water with a unique characteristic: zero nitrates.

Organisations
From 1998 to 2002 he was the president of the Mineral Waters Employers’ Organisation (OPA). Since 2000, he has been a member of the management board of the Romanian Employers’ Confederation. Since 2005, he has been a member of the FIC (foreign investors' council), and in 2007, he was elected as a member of the Management Board of F.I.C. Currently he is the vice-president of the board of the F.I.C, elected in 2012.
 
Through his Foundation, Valvis Foundation, he initiated several action to help sectors of society in need:
- Children with Disabilities UNICEF Program helping children with special needs, since 2002.

- Supporting breast cancer fighting program The Fighting Breast Cancer’ program launched by the independent, non-governmental, non-profit organisation ‘RENASTEREA BOTOSANEANA’ (Information, Culture and Health 
Foundation, was endorsed by Valvis Foundation.

- CRINA Foundation Program A program involving donation of products, on a monthly basis, for the children of CRINA foundation. The contribution started in 2006.

- Supporting in-need Greek communities from Iasi, Braila, Galati since 2000
- Supporting  450 children from Valea Plopului A program involving donation of products (since 2011)
- Valvis Class in Iasi.  A scholarship program for children with special intelligence and abilities but poor social condition (since 2008)

Awards and honours
2001: Bucharest Business Week Newspaper, Swiss Leadership Awards - "Businessman of the Year"
2002: Ziarul Financiar Daily newspaper, Leaders – People that shake the market - "Excellence Award"
2002: University of Bucharest – Research, Implementation and Micro-production Department and the Excellence Diploma for Production, Research and Marketing Activity
2004: Capital Magazine, Oskar Award - "Businessman of the Year"
2004: "The Moldavian Cross", Medal awarded by Daniel, Metropolitan Bishop of Moldavia and Bucovina, for environmental concern and workplaces created in the area.
2006: The Diplomat Magazine, Greek Investment Awards - "Best Regional Development"
2006: Bucharest Business Week Newspaper, Swiss Leadership Awards - "Most Admired Swiss Businessman"
2010: The Business Review Magazine, Annual Investment Awards - "Entrepreneur of the Year"

Brands
Mineral water: Dorna, Poiana Negri (rebranding), Izvorul Alb, Mama Căpșună, Ala Bala Portocala, Meridor, Gustul Iubirii, AQUA Carpatica
Dairy: LaDORNA, LaDORNA Bio, La DORNA Cappuccino, LaDORNA Amaretto, LaDORNA Lady Milk, LaDORNA Iaurt grecesc (Greek yoghurt), LaDORNA Iaurt a la grec (A la grec Yogurt), Lăptic cu ciocolată (Chocolate Milk), Perle de brânzică cu smântână (Cottage Cheese and Cream), Euroferme Dobrogea and Transilvania,
Wines: Chateau Valvis, Domeniile Sâmburești, Sâmburel de Olt

References

1954 births
Living people
Businesspeople from Athens
University of Paris alumni
Businesspeople from Geneva